Andrew Lawrence Patterson (December 19, 1911 – May 16, 1984) was an American Negro league infielder in the 1930s and 1940s.

A native of East Chicago, Indiana, Patterson attended Washington High School and Wiley College, where he starred in football and baseball. He broke into the Negro leagues in 1934 with the Cleveland Red Sox, and was selected to play in that season's East–West All-Star Game. After serving in the military in World War II, Patterson returned to baseball and played for the 1946 Negro World Series champion Newark Eagles.

Following his baseball career, Patterson was a high school teacher, coach, athletic director, and superintendent of schools in Houston, Texas. He died in Houston in 1984 at age 72.

References

External links
 and Baseball-Reference Black Baseball stats and Seamheads

1911 births
1984 deaths
American military personnel of World War II
Baseball players from Indiana
Cleveland Red Sox players
Homestead Grays players
Kansas City Monarchs players
Military personnel from Indiana
Newark Eagles players
People from East Chicago, Indiana
Philadelphia Stars players
Pittsburgh Crawfords players
African Americans in World War II
20th-century African-American sportspeople
Baseball infielders